American rock band Aerosmith has released nine video albums and thirty-six music videos. The band and its music have also appeared in numerous films and soundtracks, and have inspired three video games.

Video albums

Music videos
{| class="wikitable sortable"
! Title
! Date !! Director !! Stars !! Awards
|-
| "Chip Away the Stone"
| 1978 || Arnold Levine || - || -
|-
| "No Surprize"
| 1979 || Arnold Levine || - || -
|-
| "Chiquita"
| 1979 || Arnold Levine || - || -
|-
| "Lightning Strikes"
| August 1982 || Arnold Levine || - || -
|-
| "Let the Music Do the Talking"
| November 1985 || Jerry Kramer || - || -
|-
| "Walk This Way" (Run-DMC with Steven Tyler and Joe Perry)
| July 1986 || Jon Small || - || Ranked #11 in Rolling Stone'''s "Top 100 Music Videos",Ranked #5 in MTV's "100 Greatest Videos Ever Made",Ranked #11 in VH1's "100 Greatest Videos",Ranked #24 in Fuse's "25 Greatest Music Videos"
|-
| "Dude (Looks Like a Lady)"
| October 1987 ||Marty Callner || John Kalodner || -
|-
| "Angel"
| February 1988 ||Marty Callner || - || -
|-
| "Rag Doll"
| May 1988 ||Marty Callner || - || -
|-
| "Love in an Elevator"
| September 1989 ||Marty Callner || Brandi Brandt || -
|-
| "Janie's Got a Gun"
| November 1989 ||David Fincher || Kristin Dattilo,
Nicholas Guest,

Lesley Ann Warren
|MTV Video Music Award - Viewer's Choice, MTV Video Music Award for Best Rock Video,Ranked #48 in MTV's "100 Greatest Videos Ever Made",Ranked #48 in VH1's "100 Greatest Videos",Ranked #95 in Rolling Stone's "Top 100 Music Videos"
|-
| "What It Takes" (concept version)
| March 1990 || Wayne Isham || - || -
|-
| "What It Takes" (version with footage from The Making of Pump)
| April 1990 || Keith Garde & Martin Torgoff || - || -
|-
| "The Other Side"
| June 1990 ||Marty Callner || John Kalodner || MTV Video Music Award for Best Rock Video
|-
| "Dream On" (with orchestra; recorded at MTV 10th anniversary special)
| August 1991 ||Marty Callner || - || -
|-
| "Sweet Emotion"
| November 21, 1991 ||Marty Callner || - || -
|-
| "Livin' on the Edge"
| April 1993 ||Marty Callner || Edward Furlong || MTV Video Music Award - Viewer's Choice
|-
| "Eat the Rich"
| May 1993 || Greg Vernon || John Kalodner || -
|-
| "Cryin'"
| July 1993 ||Marty Callner || Alicia Silverstone, Stephen Dorff, Josh Holloway || MTV Video Music Award for Best Video of the Year,MTV Video Music Award - Viewer's Choice,MTV Video Music Award for Best Group Video
|-
| "Amazing"
| November 1993 ||Marty Callner || Alicia Silverstone, Jason London || -
|-
| "Crazy"
| May 1994 ||Marty Callner || Alicia Silverstone, Liv Tyler || Ranked #23 in VH1's Top 100 Music Videos of All Time
|-
| "Blind Man"
| October 1994 ||Marty Callner || Pamela Anderson, John Kalodner || -
|-
| "Deuces are Wild"
| November 1994 || - || - || -
|-
| "Walk on Water"
| January 1995 || Mick Haggerty || - || -
|-
| "Falling in Love (Is Hard on the Knees)"
| February 1997 ||Michael Bay ||Angie Everhart  - || MTV Video Music Award for Best Rock Video
|-
| "Hole in My Soul"
| May 1997 ||Andy Morahan || Branden Williams, Eva Mendes, Alexandra Holden, Seann William Scott || -
|-
| "Pink"
| November 1997 ||Doug Nichol || - || MTV Video Music Award for Best Rock Video
|-
| "I Don't Want to Miss a Thing"
| May 1998 ||Francis Lawrence || Liv Tyler || MTV Video Music Award for Best Video from a Film, Boston Music Awards: Best Video
|-
| "Full Circle"
| April 1998 || - || - || -
|-
| "Jaded"
| February 2001 ||Francis Lawrence || Mila Kunis || Billboard Music Video Awards: Best Hard Rock Clip of the Year,Boston Music Awards: Video of the Year
|-
| "Fly Away from Here"
| June 2001 ||Joseph Kahn || Jessica Biel || -
|-
| "Sunshine"
| October 2001 ||Samuel Bayer || - || -
|-
| "Girls of Summer"
| July 2002 ||David Meyers || Jaime Pressly- Kim Smith || 
|-
| "Lizard Love"
| 2003 || Jim Gable || - || -
|-
| "Baby, Please Don't Go"
| 2004 || Mark Haefeli || - || -
|-
| "Legendary Child"
| July 10, 2012 || Casey Patrick Tebo || Alexa Vega || -
|-
| "What Could Have Been Love"
| October 19, 2012 ||Marc Klasfeld || - || -
|}

Soundtracks

Individual songs appearing on film soundtracks
"Come Together" – Sgt. Pepper's Lonely Hearts Club Band soundtrack (1978)
"Rocking Pneumonia And The Boogie Woogie Flu" – Less than Zero soundtrack (1987)
"Love Me Two Times" – Air America soundtrack (1990)
"Dream On" – Last Action Hero soundtrack (1993)
"Deuces Are Wild" – The Beavis and Butt-Head Experience (1993)
"Dude (Looks Like a Lady)" (live) and "Shut Up and Dance" (live) – Wayne's World 2 soundtrack (1993)
"I Don't Want to Miss a Thing", "What Kind of Love Are You On", "Sweet Emotion", and "Come Together" – Armageddon soundtrack (1998)
"Angel's Eye" – Charlie's Angels soundtrack (2000)
"Theme from Spider-Man" – Spider-Man soundtrack (2002)
"Lizard Love" – Rugrats Go Wild soundtrack (2003)
"Sweet Emotion" – Starsky & Hutch soundtrack (2004)
"Walk This Way" – Sex and the City: The Movie soundtrack (2008)

Song appearances

Individual songs appearing in films/trailers.
"Sweet Emotion" – Light of Day (1987) sung by Joan Jett
"Walk This Way" – The Lost Boys and China Girl (both 1987)
"Dude (Looks Like a Lady)" – Like Father Like Son (1987)
"Back in the Saddle" – Say Anything... (1989)
"Sweet Emotion" – Dazed and Confused (1993)
"The Other Side" – True Romance (1993)
"Dude (Looks Like a Lady)" – Mrs. Doubtfire (1993)
"Line Up" – Ace Ventura: Pet Detective (1994)
"Janie's Got a Gun" – Airheads (1994)
"Sweet Emotion" – Private Parts (1997)
"I Don't Want to Miss a Thing" – Armageddon (1998)
"Back in the Saddle" – Shanghai Noon (2000)
"Toys in the Attic" and "Seasons of Wither" – Dogtown and Z-Boys (2001)
"Janie's Got a Gun" – Not Another Teen Movie (2001) sung by Chris Evans a cappella
"Dream On" – Miracle (2004)
"Walk This Way" – Racing Stripes (2005)
"Cryin'" – Be Cool (2005) - Duet with Christina Milian
"Sweet Emotion" – Be Cool (2005)
"You Gotta Move" – Barnyard (2006)
"I Don't Want to Miss a Thing" – Blades of Glory (2007)
"Back in the Saddle" – Red (2010)
"Last Child" – Grown Ups (2010)
"Dream On" – Argo'' (2012)

Video games

Filmography

See also
Aerosmith albums discography
Aerosmith singles discography
List of awards and nominations received by Aerosmith

References

 
 http://www.mvdbase.com/artist.php?last=Aerosmith

Videography
Videographies of American artists
Rock music group discographies